Milleretta is an extinct genus of millerettid parareptile from the Late Permian of South Africa. Fossils have been found in the Balfour Formation. It was probably insectivorous. Its only known species is Milleretta rubidgei, making Milleretta a monospecific genus.

Discovery
The name provided for this genus upon Robert Broom's original 1938 description was  'Millerina' , but it was later renamed in 1947 when Broom discovered that the name  'Millerina'  had already been used for a genus of fly. The new name, Milleretta, means 'Miller's little one', referring to the Scottish geologist and stonemason, Hugh Miller. When Milleretta was first described, there was only one specimen known (specimen number BP/1/3821). As this was a juvenile specimen, there was uncertainty as to its classification. It wasn't until 1950 that an adult Milleretta was discovered by J.W. Kitching on Wildgebosch farm in New Bethesda, South Africa. This specimen (specimen number BP/1/2040) was found at the Dicynodon Assemblage zone. The finding at this zone established the same geographic range compared to other millerettids.

Description
The vertebrae of Milleretta have wide neural arches, a synapomorphy of their class, Parareptilia. It had spines coming off the neural arches. Horizontally orientated zygopophyses are present, as well as prominent transverse processes. BP/1/2040's adult vertebrae contrast those of the juvenile specimen only with the fused centrum and arch in the adult. The ribs are especially sturdy dorsally, along with caudal expansions that help overlap the next rib over posteriorly. These holocephalus ribs contain crenelations. The thick ribs give protection to the cavity, but decrease the amount of flexibility of the body and decrease swiftness. Eunotosaurus shares thick and overlapped ribs. However, the thick ribs are not a synapomorphy of the two taxon, as the ribs’ thickness were acquired differently. Milleretta had plesiomorphic vertebrae and made its ribs wider by growing its bone out the shaft to airfoil-like section. In contrast, Eunotosaurus’ trunk vertebrae are stretched and it has “T” shaped ribs with double articulations. Not only are the centrum and arch fused, but the pubes and ischia are fused in its pelvic girdle. Alongside the fused bones, the dorsal blade on the ilium is expanded width-wise. The femur becoming fully ossified, complete formation of articular ends at the limbs, and expanding ribs occur as Milleretta become adults. There was a single row of teeth on the palatine.

Classification 
First named in 1956, Millerettidae was a clade containing all reptiles closer to Milleretta rubidgei than to Macroleter poezicus. Millerettids were among the most basal members of the parareptile lineage. Milleretta is considered the leased derived member of the family, relative to Milleropsis and Millerosaurus. Huge gaps are at their maximum between the period of Milleretta as ghost lineages show up. Something attributed to this family is the creation of the lateral temporal opening, which adult Milleretta managed to close completely. Eunotosaurus, which was also discovered in the Balfour Formation and lived around the same time as Milleretta, has sometimes been considered the sister taxon to Millerettidae. 

The cladogram below displays the phylogenetic position of the Milleretta, from Ruta et al., 2011.

{{clade| style=font-size:85%;line-height:85%
|label1=Parareptilia 
|1={{clade
   |label1= Mesosauria 
   |1=
   |2={{clade
      |1=Eunotosaurus africanus
      |label2= Millerettidae 
      |2={{clade
         |1=’Milleretta (rubidgei)‘'’
         |2= }}
      |label3= Procolophonomorpha 
      |3= }} }} }}

 Paleobiology 
The two specimens of Milleretta both lived at the end of the Late-Permian (Changsingian). The vast range of sharp teeth helped make it possible to chew the insects present at the time. The presumed great hearing of Milleretta helped them hunt prey by being able to better hear movement. The presumption comes from the two depressions located at the bases of the skull. At first, the depressions brought doubts to whether it was anapsid. More investigation concluded that the depressions were probably the eardrums.Milleretta probably lived in a forest-like environment due to the preserved forest-floor litter from the Karoo Basin located in South Africa. A recent examination of soil profiles shows that the environment in which Milleretta'' lived became more dry as time moved on. This change in climate may have been caused by the mass-extinction that happened in the region. Right now, there is still some uncertainty of what the conditions were like, one reason is potentially the lack of geochemical studies done in the region.

References

Permian reptiles of Africa
Parareptiles
Taxa named by Robert Broom
Fossil taxa described in 1948
Prehistoric reptiles of Africa
Prehistoric reptile genera